Ramón Balcells Rodón (17 November 1919, in Valls – 31 March 1999, in Barcelona) was a sailor from Spain.

Balcells won the Snipe Spanish National Championship in 1945 and represented his country at the 1952 Summer Olympics in Harmaja. Balcells took 10th place in the Finn. With his son Ramón Balcells and Juan Llort as fellow crew members, Balcells returned to the 1972 Summer Olympics in Kiel. Balcells then took 9th place in the Soling.

References

1919 births
1999 deaths
Olympic sailors of Spain
People from Valls
Sportspeople from the Province of Tarragona
Real Club Marítimo de Barcelona sailors
Sailors at the 1952 Summer Olympics – Finn
Sailors at the 1972 Summer Olympics – Soling
Snipe class sailors
Spanish male sailors (sport)